The D'Abrera's tiger (Parantica dabrerai) is a species of nymphalid butterfly in the Danainae subfamily. It is endemic to Sulawesi, Indonesia. The species was discovered by Bernard d'Abrera, an Australian entomological taxonomist and philosopher of science. The butterfly is described as black and white, with similar markings to a monarch butterfly.

References

Parantica
Butterflies of Indonesia
Endemic fauna of Indonesia
Butterflies described in 1978
Taxonomy articles created by Polbot